is a junction passenger railway station located in the city of Tottori, in Tottori Prefecture, Japan. It is operated by the West Japan Railway Company (JR West). It is located in the Higashihonji-chō district of the city of Tottori.

Lines
Tottori Station is also a terminus of the Inbi Line and is 73.4 kilometers from the opposing terminus at

Station layout
The station has two elevated island platforms serving four tracks located on the third floor of the station building. The station has a "Midori no Madoguchi" staffed ticket office.

Adjacent stations
West Japan Railway Company (JR West)

History
Tottori Station opened on 5 April 1908. With the privatization of JNR on 1 April 1987, the station came under the control of JR West.

Passenger statistics
In fiscal 2020, the station was used by an average of 3,896 passengers daily.

Surrounding area
Tottori City Hall
 Tottori Sand Dunes

See also
 List of railway stations in Japan

References

External links

 Tottori Station, JR West

Railway stations in Japan opened in 1908
Railway stations in Tottori Prefecture
Sanin Main Line
Tottori (city)